Bigotilia is a genus of moths in the family Pterophoridae.

Species
Bigotilia centralis (Bigot, 1964)
Bigotilia montana Gibeaux, 1994

Platyptiliini
Moth genera